Antharam  is an upcoming Indian Malayalam language film directed by P. Abhijith. The Film is about  the inner conflicts, warmth, trauma and joyous moments in the lives of a trans woman, a teenage girl and a man living under the same roof.

Negha Shahin has become the first trans woman to have won the Kerala State Film Award in the category Woman/Transgender. Antharam was the Inaugural Film in the KASHISH Mumbai International Queer Film Festival 2022.

Plot

'Sneha' is going to live with her father 'Hareendran', who is a progressive minded book shop owner. Her mind is filled with uncertainty as she leaves her lovable grandparents. She is relocating to live with her step-mom, Anjali, about whom she is totally unaware of. Sneha keeps a distance from Anjali and tries to be emotionally independent. But the changes in Hareendran torment her and she wishes for a support. Anjali, a trans woman, extends her love and care for Sneha. Sneha understands more about Anjali and becomes in awe of the life the latter has been leading. The film focus on the plight of a trans woman who had to live as a wife of an ordinary man. 'Antharam' deals with the inner conflicts, warmth, trauma and joyous moments in the lives of a Trans woman, a Teenage girl  and a Man living under the same roof.

Cast

 Negha Shahin as Anjali
 Kannan Nayar as Hareendran
 Nakshathra Manoj as Sneha 
 Rajeevan Vellur as Aravindan
 Revathi Aas Revathi Amma 
 Vihaan Peethambar as Vihaan 
 Elsy Sukumaran as Grand Mother 
 Gireesh Perincheri as Grand Father
 Jomin V Geo as Cleetus 
 Muneer Khan as Rajeevan
 Kavya as Kavya Amma
 Deeparani as Deepa 
 Laya Maria Jaison as Laya
 Ziya Paval as Ziya 
 Pooja as Pooja
 Babu Elavumthitta as Driver Divakaran

Music

Awards

Negha Shahin won the Government of Kerala's special award for Women and Transgender Films in 2022 for her performance in the film.

Participation

 Kashish Mumbai International Queer Film Festival 2022
 Bangalore Queer Film Festival 2022
 International Film Festival of Thrissur (IFFT) 2022
 Jaipur International Film Festival 2022

References

External links
 Abhijit’s ‘Antaram’ to be screened at International Film Festival | P Abhijit’s movie named ‘Antharam’ will be screened at the International Film Festival

2020s Malayalam-language films
2022 films
2022 drama films
2022 LGBT-related films
Indian drama films
Films about trans women
Indian LGBT-related films